dbt  is an open-source command line tool that helps analysts and engineers transform data in their warehouse more effectively. It started at RJMetrics in 2016 as a solution to add basic transformation capabilities to Stitch (acquired by Talend in 2018). The earliest versions of dbt allowed analysts to contribute to the data transformation process following the best practices of software engineering.

From the beginning, dbt was open source. In 2018, the dbt Labs team (then called Fishtown Analytics) released a commercial product on top of dbt Core. In April 2020, dbt Labs announced its Series A led by Andreessen Horowitz. In November, dbt Labs announced its Series B led by Andreessen Horowitz and Sequoia. And in June 2021, dbt Labs raised its Series C led by Altimeter, Sequoia, and Andreessen Horowitz. In February 2022, the company raised $222 million for its Series D, at a $4.2 billion valuation

Overview
dbt enables analytics engineers to transform data in their warehouses by writing select statements. dbt handles turning these select statements into tables and views. dbt does the transformation (T) in extract, load, transform (ELT) processes – it does not extract or load data, but is designed to be performant at transforming data already inside of a warehouse. dbt has the goal of allowing analysts to work more like software engineers, in line with the dbt viewpoint.

References

Data warehousing
Business analytics
Free software programmed in Python